The Martha's Vineyard Film Festival (MVFF) is an annual film festival founded in 2001 and held in West Tisbury, Massachusetts, on the island of Martha's Vineyard. The festival takes place in March. The MVFF also produces a summer film series in July and August, and special events at other times of the year. The festival annually screens more than fifty films.

Winter Festival 
The MVFF's main event is its winter festival in March, a long weekend of film screenings and discussions historically held at the Chilmark Community Center. In 2022, the MVFF relocated to the Grange Hall in West Tisbury.  In addition to screenings and discussions with guest filmmakers and film subjects, the winter festival includes food prepared by Vineyard chefs, art installations, and performances by local musicians.

Summer Film Series 
The MVFF's Summer Film Series (SFS) began in 2004. Originally it took place at the Chilmark Community Center every Wednesday night in July and August (and sometimes the last Wednesday in June).  Each SFS evening started with Cinema Circus revelry and a film for kids. During intermission, there was live music and a meal prepared by Vineyard chefs. The evening concluded with the feature presentation and discussion, usually attended by guest filmmakers or film subjects. In July and August of 2022, the Summer Film Series continued at the Grange Hall's second floor theater, screening films nightly Wednesday through Saturday.

Cinema Circus 
Cinema Circus was established in 2009 under the direction of Lindsey Scott, later the MVFF's Director of Children's Programs.  In addition to live-action and animated films for children, Cinema Circus events include performances by musicians, clowns, acrobats, jugglers, hula hoopers, unicyclists, stilt walkers, and puppeteers, along with face painting, costumes, and healthy snacks and meals.

Family. Film. Feast. 
The Family. Film. Feast. was a family-oriented winter series that began in 2009 and took place at the Chilmark Community Center. It featured screenings of films both parents and children could enjoy, dinners prepared by Vineyard chefs, and performances by local musicians. 

Family. Film. Feast. has included collaboration with other organizations on Martha's Vineyard. Rick Bausman and his Drum Workshop were favorite performers. IMP, the Vineyard's kid and teen comedy improv troupe, performed at a Family. Film. Feast. event in December 2010. The following month, the MVFF teamed up with Slow Food Martha's Vineyard to present a documentary film preceded by a family-friendly short films program and a “slow food” dinner prepared by Vineyard chefs Cathy Walthers, Jan Buhrman, and Robert Lionette.

Special Events 
The MVFF occasionally screens films “down-island” at Vineyard Haven's historic Capawock Theatre or Edgartown Cinema. These screenings have either been encore presentations or in advance of the winter festival or summer film series. Special screenings have included the documentaries Inside Job (prior to its 2011 Best Documentary Oscar-awarding), Pete Seeger: The Power of Song, Southern Comfort, The Present, and Surfwise, as well as the narrative feature films Ballast and Beginners.

In addition to post-screening and panel discussions with featured filmmakers, the MVFF has hosted talks by other members of the film world. Screenwriter Naomi Foner was the featured speaker on the last night of the 2007 Summer Film Series. Cinematographer Michael Chapman spoke before screenings of two of his films, and film critic A.O. Scott of The New York Times was a guest programmer and speaker during the 2008 Summer Film Series. The MVFF's tenth annual winter film festival in 2010 featured a talk by New Yorker film critic David Denby.

Greater Community Involvement 
The MVFF offers a filmmaking class for students. MVFF Managing Director Brian Ditchfield began teaching the class at the Martha's Vineyard Public Charter School in the winter of 2010.

2011 Festival Highlights 
The eleventh annual MVFF winter festival opened with Charlotte, a special sneak preview of Jeffrey Kusama-Hinte's new documentary about the Vineyard's Gannon & Benjamin Marine Railway. The director and cinematographer, Brian Dowley, and two of the film's subjects, Ross Gannon and Pam Benjamin, spoke after the screening. 

Other attending filmmakers and film subjects included Yoav Potash (Crime After Crime), Marilyn Sewell (Raw Faith), Henry Joost, Ariel Schulman, and Nev Schulman (Catfish), Laura Israel (Windfall), Sam Feuer (The First Grader), Anne Makepeace, Tobias Vanderhoop, and Wenonah Madison (We Still Live Here), and Peter Richardson (How to Die in Oregon).

References

External links 

Film festivals in Massachusetts
Martha's Vineyard